An urn is a vase-like container.

Urn may refer to:
Urn problem of probability theory
Urn (album), an album by Ne Obliviscaris

The acronym URN may refer to:
Uniform Resource Name, an Internet identifier
Unique Reference Number, an identifier of UK schools
University Radio Nottingham, England

See also